ActionAid is an international non-governmental organization whose stated primary aim is to work against poverty and injustice worldwide.

ActionAid is a federation of 45 country offices that works with communities, often via local partner organisations, on a range of development issues. It was founded in 1972 by Cecil Jackson-Cole as a child sponsorship charity (originally called Action in Distress) when 88 UK supporters sponsored 88 children in India and Kenya, the primary focus being is providing children with an education, further the human rights for all, assisting people that are in poverty, assisting those who face discrimination, and also assist people who face injustice. ActionAid works with over 15 million people in 45 countries to assist those people.

Today its head office is located in South Africa with hubs in Asia, the Americas and Europe. ActionAid was the first big INGO to move its headquarters from the global north to the global south. ActionAid's current strategy aims to "build international momentum for social, economic and environmental justice, driven by people living in poverty and exclusion".

Tax and economic justice 

ActionAid has been campaigning for tax justice since 2008, conducting research into the effects of various international tax treaties and supporting local people and organizations to hold their governments to account. It argues that losing tax revenue to avoidance harms the world's poorest and most marginalized people, who depend on tax-funded public services. It is also often the case that the tax revenue lost in these treaties can exceed the amount of international aid money send to developing countries.

In 2011, ActionAid revealed that 98% of the UK's FTSE 100 companies use tax havens. In 2013 its research into corporate tax avoidance in Zambia showed that Associated British Foods were avoiding paying millions of dollars in corporate tax.

Women's rights 

ActionAid integrates women's rights into all of its programming and project work, but also undertakes campaigns that focus specifically on these issues.

Notable examples have included raising awareness about unpaid care work and sexual harassment and violence (including acid attacks) in Bangladesh, offering free cancer tests to women in Nigeria who could not afford them, and tackling female genital mutilation in Sweden.

Climate justice 

ActionAid's advocacy work on climate change focuses on climate justice, guided by the experiences and needs of its country's programmes. Its most prominent engagement comes through the annual Conference of Parties, where it supports communities vulnerable to climate change to influence decision-making processes.

It calls for rich countries to live up to pledges of providing climate adaptation grants and pushes for agreements to improve the lives of those most vulnerable to the impacts of climate change. ActionAid was also critical of climate insurance policies, such as those purchased by Malawi in 2015, since those insurance policies fail to deliver when they are desperately needed.

Emergencies and humanitarian aid 

ActionAid promotes women's leadership in humanitarian responses, arguing that women are best positioned to identify their needs and those of the communities around them in times of crisis. Strengthening citizens' rights is also a focus, such as campaigning with Haitians for greater transparency and accountability in how aid money was spent after the 2010 Haiti earthquake.

As it has established relationships with communities and other NGOs in countries that are prone to ecological events, ActionAid is often able to respond quickly to emergencies. Notable crises and responses have included the Boxing Day tsunami in 2010 in the Indian ocean, drought in East Africa and India, and floods in Ghana, Rwanda, Sierra Leone, Bangladesh and Nepal.

On 4 October 2018 ActionAid announced that Pakistan government has ordered 18 international aid groups to leave the country.

Child sponsorship 

Child sponsorship is one of ActionAid's primary sources of income. Donors sponsor an individual child from a community in a developing country and receive regular updates about the child's progress and development.

Sponsorship funds support the child's whole community, "so children have a healthy and safe place to live and grow up." This support takes the form of providing clean water, healthcare, agricultural programmes, education centres in areas where schools are not available, and community income generation schemes.

In 2018, ActionAid USA stopped using the child sponsorship method of fundraising, and switched to a monthly giving program.

Alliance-building 

As ActionAid has grown in influence, building alliances with like-minded organisations has become a key focus area. Announcing this approach at the World Social Forum in 2015, ActionAid has played a role in convening civil society and community groups to tackle issues of youth political participation in the Middle East and global inequality.

Supporting social causes through the mass media
ActionAid made India's first Bollywood film focusing on AIDS, Ek Alag Mausam, a love story involving HIV positive people, based on a script by playwright Mahesh Dattani.

ActionAid also supported Shyam Benegal's film, Samar, which is based on the book Unheard Voices: Stories of Forgotten Lives by Harsh Mander. The film raises issues about Dalits.

Notable Leaders  
Esther Agbarakwe Youngest chair person for General Assembly of ActionAid. 

Javeria Malik  is the first Pakistani woman to lead the Global Safety and Security Unit at ActionAid International and was featured on the official website of International Women's Day 2022.  INSSA Insights has featured Javeria as the first female Chairperson of the International NGO Safety & Security Association.  Her interview published by the city security magazine  was nominated for the best article of the year award. She was interviewed by Global Interagency Security Forum to speak on the topic of inclusivity and anti racism in the nonprofit and aid sector.

See also 
 Target Poverty

References

Further reading
Brown, Lalage. Preparing the Future-Women, Literacy, and Development. Web ActionAid, 1990. March 2012. 
Ahmed, F & Werker, E. What do Non-governmental Organizations Do? Web Journal of Economic Perspectives, 2007. March 2012
ActionAid. End Poverty Together. Web. March 2012
United Nations Office on Drugs and Crime. ActionAid (South Africa). Web 2012. March 2012

External links 
 

Development charities based in South Africa
Organizations established in 1972
Organisations based in Johannesburg